The Sierra Leone Confederation of Trade Unions (TUC-SL) is a national trade union center in Sierra Leone. It was founded in 1996, and is affiliated with the World Federation of Trade Unions WFTU

References

Trade unions in Sierra Leone
International Trade Union Confederation
1996 establishments in Sierra Leone
Trade unions established in 1996